Daruvár may refer to:

 Daruvar, a city in Croatia
Daruvár, the Hungarian name for Darova Commune, Timiș County, Romania